National Highway 107 connects  Maheshkhunt and Purnia in Bihar, India.

Route 
 Sonbarsa Raj
 Simri-Bakhtiarpur
 Saharsa
 Madhepura
 Banmankhi

See also
 List of National Highways in India (by Highway Number)
 List of National Highways in India
 National Highways Development Project

References

External links
  NH network map of India

107
National highways in India (old numbering)